NGC 7016 is an elliptical or lenticular galaxy located about 480 million light-years away from Earth in the constellation Capricornus. NGC 7016's calculated velocity is 11,046 km/s. NGC 7016 has an estimated diameter of about 140 thousand light years. NGC 7016 was discovered by American astronomer Francis Preserved Leavenworth on July 8, 1885.

Physical characteristics 
NGC 7016 is one of two prominent radio galaxies in the galaxy cluster Abell 3744 along with the double galaxy system NGC 7018.

See also  
 M87
 Elliptical galaxy 
 NGC 7002
 List of NGC objects (7001–7840)

References

External links  

Elliptical galaxies
Radio galaxies
Lenticular galaxies
Capricornus (constellation)
7016
66136
Astronomical objects discovered in 1885